Olivier Dutheillet de Lamothe (born 10 November 1949) was a member of the Constitutional Council of France from 2001 to 2010.

References

1949 births
Living people
French politicians
Lycée Pasteur (Neuilly-sur-Seine) alumni
Sciences Po alumni
École nationale d'administration alumni
People from Neuilly-sur-Seine
Commandeurs of the Légion d'honneur
Knights of the Ordre national du Mérite